Taynara Melo Guevara (née de Carvalho and formerly Conti; born June 9, 1995) is a Brazilian professional wrestler and judoka. She is signed to All Elite Wrestling (AEW), where she performs under the ring name Tay Melo and is a member of the Jericho Appreciation Society. She also appears in AEW's Mexico based partner promotion Lucha Libre AAA Worldwide (AAA), where she is a former AAA World Mixed Tag Team Champion with real life husband Sammy Guevara. Prior to joining AEW, she performed in WWE on the NXT brand as Taynara Conti from 2017 to 2020.

Early life and judo 
Taynara Melo de Carvalho was born on June 9, 1995, in Rio de Janeiro. She has a brother and 2 sisters, one of whom is adopted. Melo grew up in Rio's notorious poverty-stricken and crime-infested favelas. Melo holds a black belt in judo and a blue belt in Brazilian jiu-jitsu. Melo briefly went to law school in Brazil and she participated in trials for the Brazilian Olympic team at the 2016 Summer Olympics prior to joining WWE.

Melo began her athletic career in artistic gymnastics in CR Vasco da Gama, but soon migrated to martial arts. First, Melo fought for the project "Brasil vale ouro" (Brazil is worth gold) and later went to "Instituto Reação", by judoka Flávio Canto. Melo was a regional champion and four-time state champion. In addition, she was a four-time Brazilian runner-up. She joined the Brazilian team and participated in the European circuit in Portugal and Germany.

Professional wrestling career

WWE (2016–2020) 
Melo was announced as having signed with WWE, and reported to the WWE Performance Center in October 2016. She made her professional wrestling debut as Taynara Conti at WrestleMania Axxess in Orlando, Florida on April 1, 2017, competing against Sarah Bridges in a losing effort. She took part in the inaugural Mae Young Classic, during which she lost to Lacey Evans during the first round of the tournament.

Conti appeared on television on the October 11 episode of NXT, interfering in a triple threat match between Nikki Cross, Peyton Royce, and Liv Morgan on behalf of The Undisputed Era (Adam Cole, Bobby Fish, and Kyle O'Reilly) to prevent Cross from winning the match. This led to a match between Conti and Cross on the November 1 episode of NXT, where Conti lost. On April 8, 2018, Conti performed during the pre-show of WrestleMania 34, competing in the WrestleMania Women's Battle Royal, becoming the first female Brazilian to compete on the evening of WrestleMania. Later in the year, Conti qualified for the 2018 Mae Young Classic tournament after she defeated Vanessa Borne. She defeated Jessie Elaban in the first round but lost to Lacey Lane in the second round.

On April 20, 2020, Conti was released from her WWE contract as a result of budget cuts due to the COVID-19 pandemic. Like all other talent released, she remained under the 90-day no compete clause, which expired on July 23, 2020. Conti later revealed in an interview that she had been unhappy for months at WWE and wanted to be released, but the company initially would not grant her a release out of fear she would go to All Elite Wrestling (AEW).

All Elite Wrestling (2020–present) 
On August 4, 2020, Melo appeared on AEW as Tay Conti, participating in the AEW Women's Tag Team Cup Tournament: The Deadly Draw and teaming with Anna Jay. The team, known officially as TayJay, defeated Nyla Rose and Ariane Andrew in the quarterfinals but lost to Ivelisse and Diamante during the semi-finals. On the August 26 episode of Dynamite, she received a contract from the stable The Dark Order to join them. On September 9, AEW announced that Conti had signed with the company.

On the January 13, 2021, episode of Dynamite, Conti competed for the NWA World Women's Championship for the first time, and was defeated by Serena Deeb. In the following weeks, Conti earned a title match for the AEW Women's World Championship, but she was not successful in beating the champion, Hikaru Shida, on the April 21 episode of Dynamite. In September, Conti and Anna Jay began a feud with Penelope Ford and The Bunny in a series of singles and tag matches on Dynamite and Rampage. On November 13, Conti fought again for the AEW Women's World Championship, this time facing defending champion Britt Baker at Full Gear but came up unsuccessful. The TayJay/Bunny & Ford feud came to a head when the team of Jay and Conti defeated the team of The Bunny and Ford in a Street Fight on December 31 on Rampage.

On March 6, 2022, at Revolution, Conti faced Jade Cargill for the AEW TBS Championship in a losing effort. After months of feuding, on May 29 at Double or Nothing Conti teamed up with Sammy Guevara and Frankie Kazarian in a trios mixed tag team match facing American Top Team's Ethan Page, Paige VanZant and Scorpio Sky, which Conti's team lost. On June 15, at Road Rager, Conti along with Guevara, joined the Jericho Appreciation Society, turning heel. On August 12 on Rampage Quake by the Lake under the new ring name Tay Melo, teamed up with Guevara defending the AAA World Mixed Tag Team Championship against Dante Martin and Skye Blue which they successfully retained.

Melo and Guevara then started a feud with Ruby Soho and Ortiz, trading wins during August before defeating them at All Out due to interference from Anna Jay. The feud between Melo and Soho resumed on the November 30 episode of Dynamite, leading to a match at Winter Is Coming where Soho defeated Melo. The feud continued with Melo and Jay defeating Soho and Willow Nightingale on the December 28 episode of Dynamite; Soho and Nightingale however defeated Melo and Jay on the January 11, 2023 episode of Rampage in a street fight.

Lucha Libre AAA Worldwide (2022–present)
On April 30, 2022, Conti made her AAA debut teaming with Sammy Guevara to defeat Los Vipers, Maravilla and Látigo, and Sexy Star II and Komander to win the AAA World Mixed Tag Team Championship at Triplemanía XXX. For most of the match, La Parka Negra would wrestle in Guevara's place.

Personal life 
In 2017, Melo married fellow judoka Jorge Conti. In November 2021, Melo revealed that she was no longer married, and that the couple had been separated "for a long time".

Melo has been in a relationship with fellow professional wrestler Sammy Guevara since January 2022. The couple got engaged in June in Paris and were wed on August 7, 2022, in Orlando.

She is a fan of MMA (particularly the UFC and the MMA fighters Amanda Nunes and Charles Oliveira), often comments on the events and fights of these events on her social media, in addition to having declared that she is open to a challenge of fighting MMA in the future and that she has visited a UFC Gym several times.

Championships and accomplishments 
 All Elite Wrestling
 AEW Dynamite Awards (1 time)
 Biggest WTF Moment (2022) – 
 Inside the Ropes
 Most Improved Wrestler (2021)
Lucha Libre AAA Worldwide
AAA World Mixed Tag Team Championship (1 time) – with Sammy Guevara
 Pro Wrestling Illustrated
 Ranked No. 49 of the top 150 female wrestlers in the PWI Women's 150 in 2021
 Wrestling Observer Newsletter
 Most Improved (2021)

References

External links 

 
 
 

1995 births
Living people
All Elite Wrestling personnel
Brazilian female professional wrestlers
Brazilian martial artists
Sportspeople from Rio de Janeiro (city)
Expatriate professional wrestlers
Brazilian expatriate sportspeople in the United States
Jericho Appreciation Society members
21st-century professional wrestlers
AAA World Mixed Tag Team Champions